Guillaume Bosca (born 23 October 1989) is a French professional footballer who plays as a forward for Marignane Gignac Côte Bleue.

Career
Bosca was born in Martigues. He made his professional debut with Dunkerque in a 1–0 Ligue 2 win over Toulouse FC on 22 August 2020.

Having been released by Dunkerque at the end of the 2020–21 season, he moved to Red Star of the Championnat National. He signed a two-year contract with the option of a third year. The contract was terminated by mutual consent on 24 June 2022.

References

External links
 
 Foot National Profile

1989 births
Living people
People from Martigues
Sportspeople from Bouches-du-Rhône
French footballers
Association football forwards
Marignane Gignac Côte Bleue FC players
USL Dunkerque players
Red Star F.C. players
Ligue 2 players
Championnat National players
Championnat National 2 players
Championnat National 3 players
Footballers from Provence-Alpes-Côte d'Azur